Tawhid (meaning "unification of God in Islam (Allāh)"; also romanized as Tawheed, Tavhid, Tauheed or Tevhid) is the indivisible oneness concept of monotheism in Islam. Tawhid is the religion's central and single most important concept, upon which a Muslim's entire religious adherence rests. It unequivocally holds that God in Islam (Arabic: الله Allāh) is One and Single.

Tawhid constitutes the foremost article of the Muslim profession of submission. The first part of the shahada (the Islamic declaration of faith) is the declaration of belief in the oneness of God. To attribute divinity to anything or anyone else, is shirk – an unpardonable sin according to the Qur'an, unless repented afterwards. Muslims believe that the entirety of the Islamic teaching rests on the principle of Tawhid.

From an Islamic standpoint, there is an uncompromising nondualism at the heart of the Islamic beliefs (aqidah) which is seen as distinguishing Islam from other major religions. Moreover, Tawhid requires Muslims not only to avoid worshiping multiple gods, but also to relinquish striving for money, social status or egoism.

The Qur'an asserts the existence of a single and absolute truth that transcends the world; a unique, independent and indivisible being, who is independent of the entire creation. God, according to Islam, is a universal God, rather than a local, tribal, or parochial one—God is an absolute, who integrates all affirmative values and brooks no evil.

Islamic intellectual history can be understood as a gradual unfolding of the manner in which successive generations of believers have understood the meaning and implications of professing God's Unity. Islamic scholars have different approaches toward understanding it. Islamic theology, jurisprudence, philosophy, Sufism, even to some degree the Islamic understanding of natural sciences, all seek to explain at some level the principle of tawhid.

The classical definition of tawhid was limited to declaring or preferring belief in one God and the unity of God. Although the monotheistic definition has persisted into modern Arabic, it is now more generally used to connote "unification, union, combination, fusion; standardization, regularization; consolidation, amalgamation, merger".

Chapter 112 of the Quran, titled Al-'Ikhlās (The Sincerity) reads:

Etymology 
According to Edward Lane's Lexicon on classical Arabic, tawhid is an infinite noun that means "He asserted, or declared, God to be one; he asserted, declared, or preferred belief in the unity of God" and is derived from the Arabic verb wahhada, which means "He made it one; or called it one". In modern Arabic, the verbs wahhada or yuwahhidu mean "to unite" or "bring together" something which was not one before. This reflects the struggle of monotheism against polytheism.

Name of God in Islam 

In order to explain the complexity of the unity of God and of the divine nature, the Qur'an uses 99 terms referred to as "Excellent Names of God" (Sura 7:180).The divine names project divine attributes, which, in turn, project all the levels of the creation down to the physical plane. Aside from the supreme name "Allah" and the neologism ar-Rahman (referring to the divine beneficence that creates and maintains the universe) and a few other specific names like al-Maalik al-Mulook ("King of Kings") in an authentic narration of Muhammad, other names may be shared by both God and human beings. According to the Islamic teachings, the latter is meant to serve as a reminder of God's immanence rather than being a sign of one's divinity or alternatively imposing a limitation on God's transcendent nature. Attribution of divinity to a created entity, shirk, is considered a denial of the truth of God and thus a major sin.

Shirk 

Associating partners in divinity of God is known as shirk and is the antithesis of Tawhid. It is always in the form of belief in polytheism. The term shirk is used in two senses : to mean both polytheism and something that is not polytheism but a certain form of sin. 

 Greater shirk (Shirk-al-Akbar): open and apparent;
 Lesser shirk (Shirk-al-Asghar): concealed or hidden.

Shirk. A person commits lesser shirk (Shirk-al-Asghar) when he claims to believe in God but his thoughts and actions do not reflect his belief. There are also minor forms of shirk, they must be avoided as well; these include committing a good deed to show off, making an oath in the name of anyone except God. Within Islam, shirk (polytheism) is an unforgivable crime; God may forgive any sin if one dies in that state except for committing shirk, repentance is required for its forgiveness.

Chapter 4, verse 48 of the Qur'an reads:

Chapter 4, verse 116 of the Qur'an reads:

Discerning the unity of God 

According to Hossein Nasr, Ali, the first imam (Shia view) and fourth Rashid Caliph (Sunni view), is credited with having established Islamic theology. His quotations contain the first rational proofs among Muslims of the Unity of God.

Ali states that "God is One" means that God is away from likeness and numeration and he is not divisible even in imagination.

Vincent J. Cornell, a scholar of Islamic studies quotes the following statement from Ali:

Arguments for the oneness of God

Theological
Theologians usually use reason and deduction to prove the existence, unity and oneness of God. They use a teleological argument for the existence of God as a creator based on perceived evidence of order, purpose, design, or direction—or some combination of these—in nature. Teleology is the supposition that there is a purpose or directive principle in the works and processes of nature.

Another argument which is used frequently by theologians is Reductio ad absurdum. They use it instead of positive arguments as a more efficient way to reject the ideas of opponents.

God as the cause of causes

Against the polytheism of pre-Islamic Arabia, the Qur'an argues that the knowledge of God as the creator of everything rules out the possibility of lesser gods since these beings must be themselves created. For the Qur'an, God is an immanent and transcendent deity who actively creates, maintains and destroys the universe. The reality of God as the ultimate cause of things is the belief that God is veiled from human understanding because of the secondary causes and contingent realities of things in the world. Thus the belief in the oneness of God is equated in the Qur'an with the "belief in the unseen" (Sura ). The Qur'an summarizes its task in making this "unseen", to a greater or lesser degree "seen" so that belief in the existence of God becomes a Master-Truth rather than an unreasonable belief. The Qur'an states that God's signals are so near and yet so far, demanding that its students listen to what it has to say with humility (Sura , Sura ). The Qur'an draws attention to certain observable facts, to present them as "reminders" of God instead of providing lengthy  "theological" proofs for the existence and unity of God.

Ash'ari theologians rejected cause and effect in essence, but accepted it as something that facilitates humankind's investigation and comprehension of natural processes. These medieval scholars argued that nature was composed of uniform atoms that were "re-created" at every instant by God. The laws of nature were only the customary sequence of apparent causes (customs of God), the ultimate cause of each accident being God himself. Other forms of the argument also appear in Avicenna's other works, and this argument became known as the Proof of the Truthful.

Avicenna initiated a full-fledged inquiry into the question of being, in which he distinguished between essence (Mahiat) and existence (Wujud). He argued that the fact of existence can not be inferred from or accounted for by the essence of existing things and that form and matter by themselves cannot interact and originate the movement of the universe or the progressive actualization of existing things. Existence must, therefore, be due to an agent-cause that necessitates, imparts, gives, or adds existence to an essence.

God as the necessary existent

An ontological argument for the existence of God was first proposed by Avicenna (965-1037) in the Metaphysics section of The Book of Healing Other forms of the argument also appear in Avicenna's other works, and this argument became known as the Proof of the Truthful. Avicenna initiated a full-fledged inquiry into the question of being, in which he distinguished between essence (Mahiat) and existence (Wujud). He argued that the fact of existence can not be inferred from or accounted for by the essence of existing things and that form and matter by themselves cannot interact and originate the movement of the universe or the progressive actualization of existing things. Existence must, therefore, be due to an agent-cause that necessitates, imparts, gives, or adds existence to an essence. To do so, the cause must be an existing thing and coexist with its effect.

This was the first attempt at using the method of a priori proof, which utilizes intuition and reason alone. Avicenna's proof of God's existence is unique in that it can be classified as both a cosmological argument and an ontological argument. "It is ontological insofar as ‘necessary existence’ in intellect is the first basis for arguing for a Necessary Existent". The proof is also "cosmological insofar as most of it is taken up with arguing that contingent existents cannot stand alone and must end up in a Necessary Existent". Another argument Avicenna presented for God's existence was the problem of the mind-body dichotomy.

According to Avicenna, the universe consists of a chain of actual beings, each giving existence to the one below it and responsible for the existence of the rest of the chain below. Because an actual infinite is deemed impossible by Avicenna, this chain as a whole must terminate in a being that is wholly simple and one, whose essence is its very existence, and therefore is self-sufficient and not in need of something else to give it existence. Because its existence is not contingent on or necessitated by something else but is necessary and eternal in itself, it satisfies the condition of being the necessitating cause of the entire chain that constitutes the eternal world of contingent existing things. Thus his ontological system rests on the conception of God as the Wajib al-Wujud (necessary existent). There is a gradual multiplication of beings through a timeless emanation from God as a result of his self-knowledge.

Indivisibility of God's sovereignty
The Qur'an argues that there can be no multiple sources of divine sovereignty since "behold, each god would have taken away what [each] had created, And some would have Lorded it over others!" The Qur'an argues that the stability and order prevailing throughout the universe shows that it was created and is being administered by only one God (Sura ).

The Qur'an in verse 21:22 states: "If there were numerous gods instead of one, [the heavens and the earth] would be in a sorry state". Later Muslim theologians elaborated on this verse saying that the existence of at least two gods would inevitably arise between them, at one time or another, a conflict of wills. Since two contrary wills could not possibly be realized at the same time, one of them must admit himself powerless in that particular instance. On the other hand, a powerless being can not by definition be a god. Therefore, the possibility of having more than one god is ruled out. For if a God is powerful above another, then this asserts a difference in the particular attributes that are confined to the essence of Godhood, which implies the lesser God must lack in certain necessary attributes deeming this deity as anthropomorphic and snatching away the title of a god from such entity.

Other arguments
The Qur'an argues that human beings have an instinctive distaste for polytheism: At times of crisis, for example, even the idolaters forget the false deities and call upon the one true God for help. As soon as they are relieved from the danger, they however start associating other beings with God. "So when they ride in the ships they call upon Allah, being sincerely obedient to Him, but when He brings them safe to the land, lo! they associate others (with Him)" (Sura ).

Next, the Qur'an argues that polytheism takes away from human dignity: God has honored human beings and given them charge of the physical world, and yet they disgrace their position in the world by worshipping what they carve out with their own hands.

Lastly, the Qur'an argues that monotheism is not a later discovery made by the human race, but rather there is the combined evidence of the prophetic call for monotheism throughout human history starting from Adam. The Qur'an suggests several causes for deviation from monotheism to polytheism: Great temporal power, regarded by the holder and his subjects as 'absolute' — may lead the holder to think that he is God-like; such claims were commonly forced upon, and accepted by, those who were subject to the ruler. Also, certain natural phenomena (such as the sun, the moon and the stars) inspire feelings of awe, wonder or admiration that could lead some to regard these celestial bodies as deities. Another reason for deviation from monotheism is when one becomes a slave to his or her base desires and passions. In seeking to always satisfy the desires, he or she may commit a kind of polytheism.

Interpretations 

Understanding of the meaning of Tawhid is one of the most controversial issues among Muslims. Islamic scholars have different approaches toward understanding it, comprising textualistic approach, theological approach, philosophical approach and Sufism and Irfani approach. These different approaches lead to different and in some cases opposite understanding of the issue.

Theological viewpoints

Certain theologians use the term Tawhid in a much broader meaning to denote the totality of discussion of God, his existence and his various attributes. Others go yet further and use the term to ultimately represent the totality of the "principles of religion". In its current usage, the expressions "Tawhid" or "knowledge of Tawhid" are sometimes used as an equivalent for the whole Kalam, the Islamic theology.

According to Sunni Islam, the orthodox understanding of theology is taken directly from the teachings of Muhammad with the understanding and methodology of his companions, sourced directly from the revealed scripture the Qur'an; being the main information source for understanding the oneness of God in Islam. All Muslim authorities maintain that a true understanding of God is impossible unless He introduces Himself due to the fact that God is beyond the range of human vision and senses. Therefore, God tells people who He is by speaking through the prophets. According to this view, the fundamental message of all of the prophets is: "There is no god worthy of worship except Allah (avoiding the false gods as stated in Surah hud)."

Athari/Salafi approach

The approach of textual interpretation in Islam is to avoid delving into theological speculation and did not employ the use of kalam. After exposure of the early Muslim community to challenges from Hellenistic philosophy, Sunni Muslims later developed codified theological frameworks (see Ash'ari) to uphold and defend their beliefs.

Mu'tazili school 

The Mu'tazilis liked to call themselves the men of the tawhid (ahl al-tawhid). In Maqalat al-Islamiyin, Abu al-Hasan al-Ash'ari describes the Mu'tazilite conception of the tawhid as follows:
God is unique, nothing is like him; he is neither body, nor individual, nor substance, nor accident. He is beyond time. He cannot dwell in a place or within a being; he is not the object of any creatural attribute or qualification. He is neither conditioned nor determined, neither engendered nor engendering. He is beyond the perception of the senses. The eyes cannot see him, observation cannot attain him, the imagination cannot comprehend him. He is a thing, but he is not like other things; he is omniscient, all-powerful, but his omniscience and his all-mightiness cannot be compared to anything created. He created the world without any pre-established archetype and without an auxiliary.
According to Henry Corbin, the result of this interpretation is the negation of the divine attributes, the affirmation of the created Quran, and the denial of all possibility of the vision of God in the world beyond. Mu'tazilis believed that God is deprived of all positive attributes, in the sense that all divine qualifications must be understood as being the essence itself, and declaring that God is existing ubiquitously and in everything. They resorted to metaphorical interpretations of Qur'anic verses or Prophetic reports with seemingly anthropomorphic content, e.g., the hand is the metaphorical designation of power; the face signifies the essence; the fact that God is seated on the Throne is a metaphorical image of the divine reign, and so on.

Ash'ari school

The solution proposed by Abu al-Hasan al-Ash'ari to solve the problems of tashbih and ta'til concedes that the divine Being possesses in a real sense the Attributes and Names mentioned in the Qur'an. Insofar as these Names and Attributes have a positive reality, they are distinct from the essence, but nevertheless they do not have either existence or reality apart from it. The inspiration of al-Ash'ari in this matter was on the one hand to distinguish essence and attribute as concepts, and on the other hand to see that the duality between essence and attribute should be situated not on the quantitative but on the qualitative level—something which Mu'tazilis thinking had failed to grasp.

Ash'ari theology, which dominated Sunni Islam from the tenth to the nineteenth century, insists on ultimate divine transcendence and holds that divine unity is not accessible to human reason. Ash'arism teaches that human knowledge regarding it is limited to what has been revealed through the prophets, and on such questions as God's creation of evil and the apparent anthropomorphism of God's attributes, revelation has to accepted bila kayfa (without [asking] how).

Twelvers theology

Twelvers theology is based on the Hadith which have been narrated from the Islamic prophet Muhammad, the first, fifth, sixth, seventh and eighth Imams and compiled by Shia scholars such as Al-Shaykh al-Saduq in al-Tawhid.
According to Shia theologians, the attributes and names of God have no independent and hypostatic existence apart from the being and essence of God. Any suggestion of these attributes and names being conceived of as separate is thought to entail polytheism. It would be even incorrect to say God knows by his knowledge which is in his essence but God knows by his knowledge which is his essence. Also, God has no physical form, and he is imperceptible.

Twelvers believe God is alone in being, along with his names, his attributes, his actions, his theophanies. The totality of being therefore is he, through him, comes from him, and returns to him. God is not a being next to or above other beings, his creatures; he is being, the absolute act of being (wujud mutlaq). For, if there were being other than he (i.e., creatural being), God would no longer be the Unique, i.e., the only one to be. As this Divine Essence is infinite, his qualities are the same as his essence, Essentially there is one Reality which is one and indivisible. The border between theoretical Tawhid and Shirk is to know that every reality and being in its essence, attributes and action are from him (from Him-ness), it is Tawhid. Every supernatural action of the prophets is by God's permission as Quran points to it. The border between the Tawhid and Shirk in practice is to assume something as an end in itself, independent from God, not as a road to God (to Him-ness).

Philosophical viewpoints

Al-Farabi, Al-Razi and especially Avicenna put forward an interpretation of Tawhid in light of reason, with the Qur'an and Hadith serving as a basis. Before Avicenna the discussions among Muslim philosophers were about the unity of God as divine creator and his relationship with the world as creation. The earlier philosophers were profoundly affected by the emphasis of Plotinus on Divine simplicity.

َWhether this view can be reconciled with Islam, particularly given the question of what role is left for God's will, was to become a subject of considerable controversy within intellectual Islamic discourse.

Sufi and Irfani viewpoint

In Islamic mysticism (Sufism and Irfan), Tawhid is not only the affirmation in speech of God's unity, but also as importantly a practical and existential realization of that unity. This is done by rejecting the concepts tied to the world of multiplicity, to isolate the eternal from the temporal in a practical way. The ideal is a radical purification from all worldliness. According to Vincent J. Cornall, it is possible to draw up a monist image of God (see Sufi metaphysics) by describing the reality as a unified whole, with God being a single concept that would describe or ascribe all existing things: "He is the First and the Last, the Evident and the Immanent: and He has full knowledge of all things."(Sura )" However many Muslims criticize monism for it blurs the distinction between the creator and the creature, something incompatible with the genuine and absolute monotheism of Islam.

For Muslim mystics (sufis), the affirmation in speech of God's unity is only the first step of Tawhid. Further steps involve a spiritual experience for the existential realization of that unity. Categorizations of different steps of Tawhid could be found in the works of Muslims Sufis like Junayd Baghdadi and al-Ghazali. It involves a practical rejection of the concepts tied to the world of multiplicity. Al-Junayd for example "distinguishes four steps, starting from the simple attestation of unicity which is sufficient for ordinary believers, and culminating in the highest rank reserved for the elite, when the creature totally ceases to exist before his Lord, thus achieving al-fanā fi al-tawhīd [annihilation in unity]".

Annihilation and subsistence
According to the concept of Fana, Annihilation and Subsistence, "Man's existence, or ego, or self-hood ... must be annihilated so that he can attain to his true self which is his existence and "subsistence" with God. All of man's character traits and habits, everything that pertains to his individual existence must become completely naughted and "obliterated" (mahw). Then God will give back to him his character traits and everything positive he ever possessed. But at this stage, he will know consciously and actually - not just theoretically - and with a through spiritual realization, that everything he is derives absolutely from God. He is nothing but a ray of God's Attributes manifesting the Hidden Treasure."

Unity of existence

The first detailed formulation of "Unity of Existence" (wahdat al-wujud) is closely associated to Ibn Arabi. Widely different interpretations of the meaning of the "Unity of Existence" have been proposed throughout the centuries by critics, defenders, and Western scholars. Ibn Arabi himself didn't use the term "Unity of Existence" and similar statements had been made by those before him. For example, according to al-Ghazali "There is nothing in wujud [existence] except God...Wujud [Existence] only belongs to the Real One". Ghazali explains that the fruit of spiritual ascent of the Sufi is to "witness that there is no existence in the world save God and that 'All things are perishing except his face' (Qur'an 28:88)" 

Many authors consider being or existence to be the proper designation for the reality of God. While all Muslims believe the reality of God to be one, critics hold that the term "existence" (wujud) is also used for the existence of things in this world and that the doctrine blurs the distinction between the existence of the creator and that of the creation. Defenders argued that Ibn Arabi and his followers are offering a "subtle metaphysics following the line of the Asharite formula: "The attributes are neither God nor other than God." God's "signs" (ayat) and "traces" (athar)—the creatures—are neither the same as God nor different from him, because God must be understood as both absent and present, both transcendent and immanent. Understood correctly, wahdat al-wujud elucidates the delicate balance that needs to be maintained between these two perspectives." Shah Wali Allah of Delhi argued that the Ibn Arabi's "unity of being" was experiential and based on a subjective experience of illumination or ecstasy, rather than an ontological reality.

Influences on the Muslim culture 

The Islamic doctrine of Tawhid puts forth a God whose rule, will or law are comprehensive and extend to all creatures and to all aspects of the human life. Early Muslims understood religion to thus cover the domains of state, law and society. It is believed that the entirety of the Islamic teaching rests on the principle of Tawhid. In the following, we provide a few examples of the influences of Tawhid on the Muslim culture:

Interpersonal relationship
According to the Qur'an, one consequence of properly conceived relationship between God and man as the served and servant, is the proper relationship among humans. In order to achieve the former, the Qur'an consistently "reminds" men of two points: 1. That God is one; everything except God (including the entirety of nature) is contingent upon God. 2. With all His might and glory, God is essentially the all-merciful God.

Good and evil
According to the Qur'an, Allah is the progenitor of all things, both good and evil. As is written in the Qur'an, all of humanity is created at the will of Allah, both the good and the evil; and that their natures have been predisposed as such since the beginning of creation.

According to the Qur'an, Satan deviated from the oneness of Allah in the story of creation of man by permitting his own hierarchical value system to supersede Allah's will: Allah asked the angels to bow to Adam, who he had created from clay. Satan refused, saying that "I am better than him; you created me from fire and created him from clay". The Medieval Muslim scholar, Al-Ghazali pointing out that the only legitimate "preference principle" in the sight of Allah is piety, writes: "Every time a rich man believes that he is better than a poor one, or a white man believes that he is better than a black one, then he is being arrogant. He is adopting the same hierarchical principles adopted by Iblis [Satan] in his jahl [ignorance], and thus falling into shirk [opposite of Tawhid]."

Secularism
In many jurisdictions of the world, the laws and the general attitude of the population hold that the sphere of public life should be secular, and that belief in and practice of religion should remain in the sphere of private life. One motive for adopting this stance has been to reduce the effects of conflict between followers of different religions or between adherents of secularism and those of a religion. In public life, this view insists that the authority of the state prevails over any religious authorities.

For some Islamic thinkers, these propositions infringe the doctrine of Tawhid, and are therefore anathema. If the cosmos is a unified and harmonious whole, centered around the omnipotent and omnipresent God, they hold that recognising any other authority as superior is wrong. According to one writer: "Traditionally, a Muslim is not a nationalist, or citizen of a nation-state; he has no political identity, only a religious membership in the Umma. For a traditional Muslim, Islam is the sole and sufficient identification tag and nationalism and nation-states are obstacles". Hence the idea of creating a wholly Islamic state, or a revived caliphate.

In practice, nearly all Muslims live their daily lives under some national jurisdiction and accept at least part of the constraints this involves.

Islamic art
The desire to preserve the unity and transcendence of God led to the prohibition of Muslims from creating representation or visual depictions of God, or of any Prophet including Muhammad. Representations in art of the human form are a disputed matter in fiqh. The key concern is that the use of statues or images may lead to idolatry. The dominant forms of expression in the Islamic art, thus, became calligraphy and arabesque.

See also

References

Further reading 

Banani Amin, co ed.: Richard G. Hovannisian, Georges Sabagh (1994), Poetry and Mysticism in Islam: The Heritage of Rumi, Cambridge University Press, 

William Chittick (1983), The Sufi Path of Love:The Spiritual Teachings of Rumi, State University of New York Press, 
William Chittick and Sachiko Murata (2006), The Vision of Islam, Publisher:I.B.Tauris, 
Ernst, Carl (1984), Words of Ecstasy in Sufism, State University of New York Press, 

Gottlieb, Roger S. (2006), The Oxford Handbook of Religion and Ecology, Oxford University Press, ASIN B000RKTUVS
Johnson, Steve A.(1984), "Ibn Sina's Fourth Ontological Argument for God's Existence", The Muslim World 74 (3-4), 161–171.

Mehmet, Ozay (1990), Islamic Identity and Development: Studies of the Islamic Periphery, Rutledge, ASIN: B000FBFF5Y

 
Rahman, Fazlur (1980), Major themes of the Qur'an, Bibliotheca Islamica, 

 

God in Islam
Islamic terminology
Monotheism
Shia theology